St Peter's Vicarage is an Anglican church vicarage at 308 Kennington Lane, Vauxhall, London SE11.

It was built in the late 18th century, and has been Grade II listed since 1974. St Peter's Church is next door at no 310.

References

External links
 

Grade II listed buildings in the London Borough of Lambeth
Grade II listed houses in London
Clergy houses in England
Houses in the London Borough of Lambeth
Kennington